We Are the Halluci Nation is the third studio album by Canadian electronic music group The Halluci Nation, released on September 16, 2016 by Radicalized Records, an imprint of Pirates Blend Records.

Background 
We Are the Halluci Nation is a concept album built around the "Halluci Nation", inspired by late Native American rights activist, musician and poet John Trudell. The Halluci Nation aims to "[promote] inclusivity, empathy and acceptance amongst all races and genders in the name of social justice. They believe that Indigenous people need to define their identity on their own terms." Trudell was in the process of collaborating with the group prior to his death, and is featured on two tracks.

A Tribe Called Red was inspired to create a concept album featuring the stories of Aboriginal voices, addressing the impact of colonization on indigenous people in the modern world. Among these voices was the story of Chanie Wenjack, an Ojibwe (Anishinaabe) First Nations boy who attempted to escape his residential school and died of hunger and exposure. This was inspired originally by Gord Downie, the lead singer of The Tragically Hip, who brought public attention to Wenjack's story in 2016 with his solo album Secret Path. Ian Campeau spoke about the band's involvement in the Wenjack project in an interview for Q, noting Joseph Boyden's involvement with Wenjack.

Critical reception 
The album received acclaim upon reception. We Are the Halluci Nation was nominated for CBC Music's Best Canadian Album of the Year. Pitchfork assigned the album a rating of 8.1 out of 10, calling it "politically thrilling and immediate." Exclaim!s David Dacks praised the "dancehall-indebted polyrhythms and creative beatmaking", and Now described it as "powerful protest music set to pounding beats."

A Tribe Called Red was recognized with the Jack Richardson Producer of the Year Award at the Juno Awards of 2017 for their work on We Are the Halluci Nation.

The album was a shortlisted nominee for the 2017 Polaris Music Prize.

Track listing

Charts

References

External links 
 
 We Are the Halluci Nation. Band website. Retrieved April 12, 2017

2016 albums
A Tribe Called Red albums